Pozdvižení v Efesu (Turmoil in Ephesus) is a Czech-language opéra bouffe by Iša Krejčí to a libretto by Josef Bachtík based on Shakespeare's The Comedy of Errors. It was written from 1939 until 1943.

Recordings
 "Co láska je? Co o ni vis?" Zdeněk Otava

References

1943 operas
Czech-language operas
Operas based on works by William Shakespeare
Works based on The Comedy of Errors
Operas